Bryant is an unincorporated community located in Langlade County, Wisconsin, United States. Bryant is located on Wisconsin Highway 52 northeast of Antigo, in the town of Price. Bryant had a post office, which closed on August 16, 1997.

Bryant was named for Sherburn M. Bryant, the original owner of land surrounding the town site.

Recreation
Kettlebowl Ski Area is located near the community.

References

Unincorporated communities in Langlade County, Wisconsin
Unincorporated communities in Wisconsin